Cleber Leite (13 May 1969 – 22 April 2017) was a Brazilian rower. He competed in the men's coxed four event at the 1992 Summer Olympics.

References

External links
 

1969 births
2017 deaths
Brazilian male rowers
Olympic rowers of Brazil
Rowers at the 1992 Summer Olympics
Rowers from Rio de Janeiro (city)